Kate Elizabeth Steele (born 9 September 1983) is an Australian singer, guitarist and songwriter of the four-piece rock band, Little Birdy.

Biography

Early life
Steele was born Kate Elizabeth Steele in Perth, Western Australia, and has a fraternal twin brother, Jake. She and her brother are the youngest in the family. Her father, Rick Steele, is a New Zealand-born accomplished blues musician who still performs today, together with Katy's oldest brother Jesse on drums, in his band, Rick Steele & The Hot Biscuit Band. Her other older brother Luke, is the vocalist, guitarist and songwriter of alternative rock band The Sleepy Jackson and also a member of the electronic music duo, Empire of the Sun. Jake performs on keyboards with his own band, Injured Ninja.

Steele grew up in the southern suburb of Jandakot and went to Mount Lawley Senior High School.  She first started playing in Perth electro-pop band, The Plastik Scene, in 2001.

Little Birdy (2002–2009)

In 2002, Steele left the band and joined Simon Leach forming Little Birdy.
Steele won the inaugural Jessica Michalik Contemporary Music Award, presented by The Big Day Out on 8 March 2004. In 2004, she was also awarded the Contemporary Music Prize by the Australasian Performing Right Association (APRA). 
At the 2005 West Australian Music Industry Awards Steele won the WAMi for 'Best Female Vocalist'.  She also recorded a version of the classic, "Six Months In a Leaky Boat", on the compilation album, She Will Have Her Way, a collection of Neil and Tim Finn songs performed by female Australian and New Zealand musicians.  The song reached number 96 on Triple J's Hottest 100 for 2005

In 2007, Steele won best female performer in the Australian live music awards. Katy has attracted comparisons to Kate Bush and PJ Harvey .

Also in 2007, Steele was invited by Paul Kelly to open for him on his 2007 'Stolen Apples' tour. Faced with a long run of solo shows, Steele set about writing new material.  The material was then adapted and forms the basis of Little Birdy's new album, Confetti.

In 2008, Steele relocated to Brunswick, with the other band members also moving to Melbourne. In early 2010 Steele announced on Triple J radio that she would be moving to New York and the band announced that they would be taking some time out to pursue other individual ventures.

Solo career (2010–present)

Steele moved to New York City in March 2010 for a change of scenery, and to start work on her new solo project.  
"I’ve always loved the idea of NYC. The largeness, the intensity, the struggle. A lot of my idols have either come from New York or moved there at some point, so it’s something I’ve always wanted to do. There has never really been a chance in my life before now to have a break, or to pursue other directions."

In May 2010, Steele returned home for a whirlwind sold-out tour to the major capital cities. She showcased her new material, along with some old classics, and stirred the audience with insights into her new life, and love, in New York.

In July 2010, Steele was back in Australia supporting Richard Ashcroft (The Verve) on the Australian leg of his tour, and upon her return to New York, she announced her appointment as the Music Ambassador for the Williamsburg International Film Festival (Willifest 2010), for which a video for her song "Sorrow" was recorded.

Steele collaborated with her brother, Luke on  "Good Things" as part of a Maurice Frawley tribute album.

In late November 2011, Steele featured in a new release singing harmonies with Josh Pyke on the song, "Punch in the Heart". The video for the song sees both singers in a split-screen view performing twin one-take recordings singing to the camera.

On 13 March 2013, Steele's first single, "Fire Me Up" premiered on the Triple J radio program Home & Hosed.  "Fire Me Up" was also available through Bandcamp, where the track could be downloaded for free. 

Steele released her debut studio album, Human, on 21 October 2016. The album reached No. 23 on the Australian album charts and Steele undertook a thirteen-date national tour in February to March 2017 in support of the album's release.

On 29 September 2022, Steele released her first single since 2013, titled "Feel So Bad".

Personal life
In December 2017 Steele married Scottish musician, Graham McLuskie, and in April 2018 she had a daughter, Iona.

Discography

Studio albums

Awards and nominations

West Australian Music Industry Awards
The West Australian Music Industry Awards (WAMIs) are annual awards presented to the local contemporary music industry, put on annually by the Western Australian Music Industry Association Inc (WAM). Katy Steele won three awards.
 
 (wins only)
|-
| 2003
| Katy Steele
| Most Popular Local Original Female Vocalist 
| 
|-
| 2005
| Katy Steele 
| Best Female Vocalist
| 
|-
| 2006
| Katy Steele 
| Best Female Vocalist
| 
|-
|}

References

Living people
1983 births
Australian songwriters
Musicians from Perth, Western Australia
Australian people of Māori descent
Australian people of New Zealand descent
Australian people of Russian descent
Australian multi-instrumentalists
People educated at Mount Lawley Senior High School
21st-century Australian singers
21st-century Australian women singers
Australian twins